De facto is a Latin expression that means "by [the] fact".

De Facto may also refer to:
 De Facto (band), a dub reggae band
 De Facto (De Facto album), 1999
 De Facto (Marčelo album), 2003

See also 
 Defaqto